{{Taxobox
| name = Paratilapia sp. nov. 'Fiamanga| image = 
| status = DD | status_system = IUCN3.1
| regnum = Animalia
| phylum = Chordata
| classis = Actinopterygii
| ordo = Perciformes
| familia = Cichlidae
| genus = Paratilapia
| species = P. sp. nov. 'Fiamanga'| binomial = Paratilapia sp. nov. 'Fiamanga| binomial_authority = 
| synonyms = 
}}Paratilapia sp. nov. 'Fiamanga' is a species of fish in the family Cichlidae. It is endemic to Madagascar.  Its natural habitat is rivers. It is threatened by habitat loss.

Sources

Paratilapia
Freshwater fish of Madagascar
Undescribed vertebrate species
Taxonomy articles created by Polbot
Taxobox binomials not recognized by IUCN